The women's 100 metres competition of the athletics events at the 2019 Pan American Games will take place between the 6 and 7 of August at the 2019 Pan American Games Athletics Stadium. The defending Pan American Games champion is Sherone Simpson from Jamaica.

Summary
Coming out of the blocks, American collegian Twanisha Terry had the best start.  It took about 5 steps before Olympic champion Elaine Thompson began to assert herself.  When Thompson was rolling, nobody could stay with her.  It took Michelle-Lee Ahye about 70 metres to get past Terry, 85 for Vitória Cristina Rosa to move past for bronze.

Records
Prior to this competition, the existing world and Pan American Games records were as follows:

Schedule

Results
All times shown are in seconds.

Semifinal
Qualification: First 2 in each heat (Q) and next 2 fastest (q) qualified for the final. 

Wind:Heat 1: +0.3 m/s, Heat 2: -0.4 m/s, Heat 3: -1.1 m/s

Final
Wind: -0.6 m/s

References

Athletics at the 2019 Pan American Games
2019